Korsis Island is the rocky island lying 150 m off the northwest coast of Snow Island in the South Shetland Islands, Antarctica. It extends 300 m in southeast-northwest direction and 180 m wide. The feature is named after the Bulgarian military commander Korsis, 9th century.

Location
Bulgarian mapping in 2009.

Maps
 L.L. Ivanov. Antarctica: Livingston Island and Greenwich, Robert, Snow and Smith Islands. Scale 1:120000 topographic map.  Troyan: Manfred Wörner Foundation, 2009.
 Antarctic Digital Database (ADD). Scale 1:250000 topographic map of Antarctica. Scientific Committee on Antarctic Research (SCAR). Since 1993, regularly upgraded and updated

References
 Bulgarian Antarctic Gazetteer. Antarctic Place-names Commission. (details in Bulgarian, basic data in English)
 Korsis Island. SCAR Composite Gazetteer of Antarctica

External links
 Korsis Island. Copernix satellite image

Islands of the South Shetland Islands
Bulgaria and the Antarctic